A53 may refer to:
 Old Indian Defence, Encyclopaedia of Chess Openings code
 A53 road (England)
 A53 steel, a carbon steel alloy
 ARM Cortex-A53, a microprocessor
 Samsung Galaxy A53 5G, an Android smartphone